Bohdanivka may refer to several populated places in Ukraine:

 Bohdanivka, Pavlohrad Raion, Dnipropetrovsk Oblast, a village near Ternivka 
 Bohdanivka, Volnovakha Raion, Donetsk Oblast, a village
 Bohdanivka, Boryspil Raion, Kyiv Oblast, a village
 Bohdanivka, Luhansk Oblast, a village